Lukáš Zima (born 9 January 1994) is a Czech professional footballer who plays as a goalkeeper for Eerste Divisie club VVV-Venlo.

Club career
Lukáš Zima made his senior debut with Reggiana in the match against Como won 2–0.

On 30 July 2018, Zima joined to Serie B team Livorno on loan with an option to buy. They exercised their option and made transfer permanent in July 2019. In September 2020, he rejoined Genoa on a free transfer. 

On 13 July 2021, he signed a two-year contract with VVV-Venlo in the Netherlands.

References

External links

1994 births
Living people
Association football goalkeepers
Czech footballers
Czech Republic youth international footballers
Czech Republic under-21 international footballers
Genoa C.F.C. players
A.C. Reggiana 1919 players
Venezia F.C. players
Mantova 1911 players
A.C. Perugia Calcio players
U.S. Livorno 1915 players
VVV-Venlo players
Czech expatriate footballers
Expatriate footballers in Italy
Czech expatriate sportspeople in Italy
Expatriate footballers in the Netherlands
Czech expatriate sportspeople in the Netherlands
Serie B players
Serie C players
Sportspeople from Hradec Králové